New Zealand political leader Harry Holland assembled a spokesperson system amongst the Labour caucus following his elevation to become Leader of the Opposition on 16 June 1926, when Labour won the 1926 Eden by-election. As the Labour Party formed the largest party not in government, his frontbench team was as a result the Official Opposition of the New Zealand House of Representatives.

Holland once again became Leader of the Opposition in 1931 after his agreement to give confidence in the house to the United Party government ended. He remained leader until his death in 1933.

Frontbench team
The list below contains a list of Holland's spokespeople and their respective roles:

1926–28

1931–33

Notes

References

New Zealand Labour Party
Holland, Harry